Aiquile Municipality is the first municipal section of the Narciso Campero Province in the Cochabamba Department, Bolivia. Its seat is Aiquile.

Cantons 
The municipality is divided into three cantons. They are (their seats in parentheses):
 Aiquile Canton - (Aiquile)
 Quiroga Canton - (Quiroga)
 Villa Granado Canton - (Villa Granado)

Languages 
The languages spoken in the Aiquile Municipality are mainly Quechua and Spanish.

See also 
 Chhijmuri

References 

 Instituto Nacional de Estadistica de Bolivia

External links 
 Population data and map of Aiquile Municipality

Municipalities of the Cochabamba Department